The Jefferson County Alms House, also known as Snow Hill Farm, located near Leetown, West Virginia, is an historic Federal style house.  Snow Hill was built circa 1813 for John Hurst, son of James Hurst, a prosperous local landowner.  In 1857, Snow Hill was purchased from the Hurst family for use as a farm for the local poor. By 1931 the Alms House (also known as the County Infirmary) had declined to the point that it had become a local disgrace.  Corrective measures were taken, and the Infirmary survived until 1959, when its last nine inmates were moved to other quarters.

The property now houses a number of County agencies.

References

External links
 Jefferson County Alms House - History at Jefferson County Historic Landmarks Commission

Houses on the National Register of Historic Places in West Virginia
Houses in Jefferson County, West Virginia
Federal architecture in West Virginia
Farms on the National Register of Historic Places in West Virginia
Public housing in West Virginia
National Register of Historic Places in Jefferson County, West Virginia
Houses completed in 1813
1813 establishments in Virginia